Chiya may refer to:

Chiya (Urara Meirocho), a character in the manga series Urara Meirocho
Chiya Dam, a dam in Okayama Prefecture, Japan
Toriko Chiya, Japanese manga artist

People with the given name
, Japanese writer

See also
Hiyya (disambiguation)

Japanese feminine given names